Tuscany is one of the 20 regions of Italy.

Tuscany or Tuscani may also refer to:

Places
Grand Duchy of Tuscany, the government of the Italian region from 1569 to 1859
Tuscany, Calgary, Canada
Tuscany (C-Train), a light rail station
Tuscany-Canterbury, Baltimore, United States

Other uses
Apache Tuscany, a Service-Oriented Architecture (SOA) programming model
Eccellenza Tuscany, a division of football clubs
Tuscani, an alternate name for the Hyundai Tiburon
Tuscany, a luxury diesel motorhome line built by Thor Industries
Tuscany (album), a 2001 album by the progressive band Renaissance

See also
Etruscan (disambiguation)
Kapp Toscana, a headland of Spitsbergen, Svalbard, Norway
Toscano (disambiguation)
Tuscan (disambiguation)